Yalitza Aparicio Martínez (born 11 December 1993) is a Mexican actress and preschool teacher. She made her film debut as Cleo in Alfonso Cuarón's 2018 drama Roma, which earned her a nomination for the Academy Award for Best Actress. In 2019, Time magazine named her one of the 100 most influential people in the world. On 4 October 2019, she was named the UNESCO Goodwill Ambassador for Indigenous Peoples.

Early life
Yalitza Aparicio Martínez was born 11 December 1993 in Tlaxiaco, Oaxaca. Her parents are of indigenous origin; her father is Mixtec and her mother is Triqui. She was not, however, fluent in the Mixtec language and had to learn it for her role in Roma. Aparicio was raised by a single mother who worked as a maid. She does not have formal training in acting, but rather has pursued a degree in pre-school education while already holding a degree in early childhood education and worked in a school. She won her first acting role just prior to qualifying as a teacher.

Career
Aparicio made her acting debut in the drama film Roma, which was written and directed by Alfonso Cuarón. The film was released in November 2018. Aparicio received critical acclaim, with Peter Bradshaw of The Guardian stating that she "brings to the role something gentle, delicate, stoic and selfless. She is the jewel of this outstanding film."

For her performance, she was nominated for the Academy Award for Best Actress, becoming the first Indigenous American woman to receive a Best Actress Oscar nomination.

She also earned nominations in the same category from the Chicago Film Critics Association, the Critics' Choice Movie Awards, the Hollywood Film Awards, the Gotham Awards, the San Francisco Film Critics Circle, the Satellite Awards, and the Women Film Critics Circle, as well as recognition from Time and The New York Times.

Aparicio appeared on the cover of Vogue México in January 2019. She also appeared in the Vanity Fair 2019 "Hollywood Issue" cover. Aparicio was given the keys to Panama City, Panama, on 8 April 2019.

Filmography

Film 
 Roma (2018) – Cleo
 Hijas de Brujas (short; 2021) – Clara 
 Presencias (2022)

Television 
 Mujeres asesinas (2022) - Rocío "La Insomne" 
 Midnight Family (2022) - TBA
 Los Espookys (2022) - The Moon

Recognition
She was recognized as one of the BBC's 100 women of 2019.

Awards and nominations

References

External links 

 

1993 births
Living people
20th-century indigenous people of the Americas
21st-century indigenous people of the Americas
21st-century Mexican actresses
21st-century Mexican educators
Actresses from Oaxaca
Mexican film actresses
Mixtec people
People from Tlaxiaco
Mexican schoolteachers
Triqui people
UNESCO Goodwill Ambassadors
BBC 100 Women
Indigenous actors of the Americas
21st-century women educators
Indigenous Mexican women